Vermilion Peak is a  mountain summit located in the Vermilion River Valley of Kootenay National Park, in British Columbia, Canada. It is part of the Ball Range, which is a sub-range of the Canadian Rockies. Its nearest higher peak is Stanley Peak,  to the east. Vermilion Peak can be seen from the Banff–Windermere Parkway as it traverses the base of the mountain.

History
Vermilion Peak stands to the east of the ochre beds along Ochre Creek that the Ktunaxa First Nations discovered and used for trading. The Ktunaxa would convert the ochre into red oxide, calling it vermilion. Vermilion Peak takes its name from this. The mountain's name was officially adopted April 3, 1952, by the Geographical Names Board of Canada.

Geology
Vermilion Peak is composed of drag-folded rocks of the Goodsir Group, a sedimentary rock laid down during the Precambrian to Jurassic periods and pushed east and over the top of younger rock during the Laramide orogeny.

Climate
Based on the Köppen climate classification, Vermilion Peak has an alpine climate with cold, snowy winters, and mild summers. Temperatures can drop below −20 °C with wind chill factors  below −30 °C. Precipitation runoff from the mountain drains into tributaries of the Vermilion River.

See also

Geology of the Rocky Mountains
Geography of British Columbia

References

External links
 Parks Canada web site: Kootenay National Park
 Weather forecast: Vermilion Peak

Two-thousanders of British Columbia
Canadian Rockies
Kootenay National Park
Kootenay Land District